Stuart Ferguson is a rugby union, and professional rugby league footballer who played in the 1960s and 1970s.

Playing career

International honours
Stuart Ferguson represented Wales XV on the 1968 Wales rugby union tour of Argentina, no caps were awarded at the time, but he was later awarded a Welsh Rugby Union President's cap, and won a cap for Wales (RL) while at Leigh in 1970.

Challenge Cup Final appearances
Stuart Ferguson played , i.e. number 2, in Leigh's 24–7 victory over Leeds in the 1971 Challenge Cup Final during the 1970–71 season at Wembley Stadium, London on Saturday 15 May 1971, in front of a crowd of 85,514.

County Cup Final appearances
Stuart Ferguson played , and scored 2-goals in Leigh's 7–4 victory over St. Helens in the 1970 Lancashire County Cup Final during the 1970–71 season at Station Road, Swinton on Saturday 28 November 1970.

BBC2 Floodlit Trophy Final appearances
Stuart Ferguson played , and scored 3-goals in Leigh's 11–6 victory over Wigan in the 1969 BBC2 Floodlit Trophy Final during the 1969–70 season at Central Park, Wigan on Tuesday 16 December 1969.

Club career
Stuart Ferguson scored in all of Leigh's matches during the 1970–71 season, the only other Welshman to score in all of his club's matches in a season is David Watkins at Salford.

References

External links
Photograph at swansearfc.co.uk
Swansea RFC - Post war appearances > 100
Swansea RFC - Post war try scorers > 10
Swansea RFC - Post war points scorers > 100
Team – Past Players – F at swansearfc.co.uk
Profile at swansearfc.co.uk
The definitive list of the unluckiest Welsh rugby players who never played for Wales

Living people
Footballers who switched code
Leigh Leopards players
Place of birth missing (living people)
Rugby league fullbacks
Rugby league wingers
Rugby union wings
Swansea RFC players
Wales national rugby league team players
Welsh rugby league players
Welsh rugby union players
Year of birth missing (living people)